Bernard Privat (25 October 1914 – 11 October 1985) was a French writer and editor.

Biography
Bernard Privat received the Prix Femina for Au pied du mur in 1959.

He was also in charge of the éditions Grasset for over twenty-five years. As Bernard Grasset's nephew, Bernard Privat took the job in 1954. In 1967, along with his friend Jean-Claude Fasquelle, he merged his publishing company with the éditions Fasquelle. He would go on to publish authors such as Yves Berger, François Nourissier, Françoise Mallet-Joris, Matthieu Galey, Françoise Verny, and Edmonde Charles-Roux, who received the Prix Goncourt with Oublier Palerme. Bernard Privat left his job at the éditions Grasset in 1981.

Bibliography
Cet ange en moi (1943, poetry)
Églogues by Virgil (1948, translation)
Armance (1947)
Au pied du mur, (1959, Prix Femina)
Une nuit sans sommeil (1966)
La Jeune Fille (1976)
L'Itinéraire (1982)

References

1914 births
1985 deaths
Prix Femina winners
20th-century French novelists
20th-century French poets
French male poets
French male novelists
20th-century French male writers